Global Politician was an online magazine of politics that published analysis of current events, as well as interviews with politicians, government officials, diplomats, book authors and terrorists. It was founded in October 2004 and is based in New York.

Description
The magazine was founded in 2004 by David Storobin. In 2005, Storobin was credited as editor-in-chief of the Global Politician in Citizens Magazine.

The last editor-in-chief of the Global Politician was Sam Vaknin.

Interviews—partial list
President of Sri Lanka Chandrika Kumaratunga.
Finance Minister(later Prime Minister) of Macedonia Nikola Gruevski
President of Macedonia Boris Trajkovski.
Former President of Lebanon Amine Gemayel.
UK Spy Glen Jenvey who Identified The People Behind London Bombings. 
Hezbollah Official Abdallah Kassir. 
UK MP Brian Binley - Iran's Nukes Won't Be Bombed. 
Iraqi General Ali Ibrahim Al-Tikriti — WMD went to Syria.
Brazilian Former Guerilla/Terrorist and Current Congressman Fernando Gabeira. 
Fathi Abou al-Aardat, Senior Fatah Leader and Secretary of the Palestine Committee and Union in Lebanon. 
Israeli MK Benny Elon. 
Former Lebanese Foreign Minister Fares Boueiz. 
Hezbollah's political officer and director of foreign media relations Hussein Naboulsi. 
South African Freedom Front General-Secretary Colonel Piet Uys.
Head of Lebanon's National Liberal Party Dory Chamoun. 
Interview with Lebanese Parliament Member Nayla Moawad.
Alex Linder of the Vanguard News Network.

Other notable contributors
 Michael S. Hart – Ebooks inventor and founder of Project Gutenberg writes on computing topics.
 Glen Jenvey (as researcher)
 Faisal Kutty
 Dominic Whiteman

References

External links
 Global Politician
 Global Politician at the Internet Archive since November 2004.

Conservative magazines published in the United States
American news websites
Online magazines published in the United States
Defunct political magazines published in the United States
Magazines established in 2004
Magazines published in New York City
Magazines with year of disestablishment missing